"Your Love" is a song by Montreal-based vocal group Lime, released as a single in March 1981. Along with the track "You're My Magician", the single spent one week at number-one on the U.S. Dance chart in April 1981.

References

1980 songs
1981 singles
Hi-NRG songs
PolyGram singles
Song recordings produced by Robbie Buchanan